Qaimpur is a city in Punjab, Pakistan It comes under the Hasilpur Tehsil administrative division of the Bahawalpur District. Qaimpur was once an important ancient route in Mughal and Abbasi era. It is a small town with population of around 20,000.

The town is located on the main highway between Hasilpur and Bahawalpur; it is 80 km far away from Bahawalpur. Town is hundreds years old and still there are some pre partition Hindu's and Sikh's homes still standing. One of the residents from Qaimpur named Muawia Khizar has traveled to more than 20 countries and plans to visit every country in the world. 

It is located at 28.5268 N, 70.3403 E, and sits at an altitude of 79m.

See also
 Qaimpur railway station

References

Populated places in Bahawalpur District